Acokanthera laevigata is a flowering plant, growing up to  tall. Its flowers are white and fragrant. The plant has been used as arrow poison. A laevigata is native to Tanzania and Malawi.

References

laevigata
Plants described in 1982
Flora of Tanzania
Flora of Malawi